Upstream may refer to:
 Upstream (hydrology)
 Upstream (bioprocess)
 Upstream (film), a 1927 film by John Ford
 Upstream (networking)
 Upstream (newspaper), a newspaper covering the oil and gas industry
 Upstream (petroleum industry)
 Upstream (software development)
 Upstream (streaming service), a Philippine digital over-the-top streaming service
 Upstream and downstream (DNA), determining relative positions on DNA
 Upstream and downstream (transduction), determining temporal and mechanistic order of cellular and molecular events of signal transduction
 Upstream collection, a set of NSA internet surveillance programs

See also
 Upstream server
 Downstream (disambiguation)